Duga was an over-the-horizon radar (OTH) system used in the Soviet Union as part of its early-warning radar network for missile defense. It operated from July 1976 to December 1989. Two operational duga radars were deployed, with one near Chernobyl and Chernihiv in the Ukrainian SSR (present-day Ukraine), and the other in eastern Siberia (present-day Russia).

The duga system was extremely powerful, reaching over 10MW, and broadcast in the shortwave radio bands. It was given the nickname Russian Woodpecker by shortwave listeners for its emissions randomly appearing and sounding like sharp, repetitive tapping noises at a frequency of 10Hz. The random frequency hops often disrupted legitimate broadcasts, amateur radio operations, oceanic commercial aviation communications, and utility transmissions, resulting in thousands of complaints by many countries worldwide. The signal became such a nuisance that some communications receivers began including "Woodpecker Blankers" in their circuit designs.

The unclaimed signal was a source of speculation, giving rise to theories such as Soviet brainwashing and weather modification experiments. However, because of its distinctive transmission pattern, many experts and amateur radio hobbyists realized it was an over-the-horizon radar system. This massive structure formed a phased array and was necessary in order to provide high gain at HF as well as facilitating beam-steering, though it's unconfirmed whether the latter was actually used in normal operation. While the amateur radio community was well aware of the system, the OTH theory was not publicly confirmed until after the dissolution of the Soviet Union.

History

Genesis
The Soviets had been working on early-warning radar for their anti-ballistic missile systems through the 1960s, but most of these had been line-of-sight systems that were useful for rapid analysis and interception only. None of these systems had the capability to provide early warning of a launch, within seconds or minutes of a launch, which would give the defences time to study the attack and plan a response. At the time, the Soviet early warning satellite network was not well developed. An over-the-horizon radar sited in the USSR would help solve this problem, and work on such a system for this associated role started in the late 1960s.

This was followed by the prototype Duga, built on the same site, which was able to track launches from the far east and submarines in the Pacific Ocean as the missiles flew towards Novaya Zemlya. Both of these radar systems were aimed east and were fairly low power, but with the concept proven, work began on an operational system.

"Russian Woodpecker"
At some point in 1976, a new and powerful radio signal was detected simultaneously worldwide, and quickly dubbed 'the Woodpecker' by amateur radio operators. Transmission power on some Woodpecker transmitters was estimated to be as high as 10MW equivalent isotropically radiated power. Even prior to 1976, a similar 'woodpecker' interference is remembered by radio amateurs occurring in the high frequencies. As early as 1963, or before, radio amateurs were calling this "the Russian Woodpecker". Little is known about the power levels or Russian designation but it was probably a forerunner of the Duga radar systems. It was also speculated at that time, at least among radio amateurs, that this was an over-the-horizon radar.

These signals even caused interference on 27MHz CB radios in the late 60s and early 70s sometimes completely blocking even local communications in Portugal for example, leading to the supposition of several Megawatts of RF power transmission.

Triangulation by amateur radio hobbyists and NATO showed the signals came from a location in present-day Ukraine, at the time called Ukrainian Soviet Socialist Republic (part of USSR). Confusion due to small differences in the reports being made from various sources led to the site being variously located near Kyiv, Minsk, Chernobyl, Gomel or Chernihiv. At one time there was speculation that several transmitters were in use.

The radar system was given the code 5Н32-West by the Soviets, and was set up in two closed towns, Liubech-1 held the two transmitters and Chernobyl-2 the receivers. Unknown to civilian observers at the time, NATO was aware of the new installation. A second installation was built near Komsomolsk-on-Amur, in Bolshya Kartel and Lian, but did not become active for some time.

NATO Reporting Name
The NATO reporting name for the Duga-1 is often quoted as STEEL YARD.  Many online and several print references use this name.  However some sources also use the term STEEL WORK (or STEEL WORKS).  As any "official" sources using NATO Reporting Names are likely to be classified, establishing the true name will be difficult.  The earliest found open source mention of a NATO Reporting Name for this system, a reference publication in print while the system was still active, unambiguously uses the term STEEL WORK.

Civilian identification
Even from the earliest reports it was suspected that the signals were tests of an over-the-horizon radar, and this remained the most popular hypothesis during the Cold War. Several other theories were floated as well, including everything from jamming western broadcasts to submarine communications. The broadcast jamming theory was discarded early on when a monitoring survey showed that Radio Moscow and other pro-Soviet stations were just as badly affected by woodpecker interference as Western stations.

As more information about the signal became available, its purpose as a radar signal became increasingly obvious. In particular, its signal contained a clearly recognizable structure in each BPSK modulated pulse, which was eventually identified as a 31-bit pseudo-random binary sequence with properties much like Barker codes, with a bit-width of 100 μs resulting in a 3.1 ms pulse. This system took advantage of pulse compression to increase the power of the received echoes thereby increasing the sensitivity and effective range. When a second Woodpecker appeared, located in eastern Russia, but also pointed toward the US and covering blank spots in the first system's pattern, this conclusion became inescapable. These further installations allowed for more precise pin-pointing of potential targets or missiles in multiple dimensions thanks in part to the properties of the Barker codes that allow for multiple radars operating on the same frequencies without significant interference.

In 1988, the U.S. Federal Communications Commission (FCC) conducted a study on the Woodpecker signal. Data analysis showed a pulse repetition interval (PRI) of about 90ms, a frequency range of 7 to 19MHz, a bandwidth of 0.02 to 0.8MHz, and typical transmission time of 7 minutes. 

The pulses transmitted by the Woodpecker had a wide bandwidth, typically 40 kHz. Their repetition frequencies were 10Hz, 16Hz and 20Hz with the most common frequency of 10Hz, while the 16Hz and 20Hz modes were rarely used.

Jamming the Woodpecker

To combat this interference, amateur radio operators attempted to jam the signal by transmitting synchronized unmodulated continuous wave signals at the same pulse rate as the offending signal. They formed a club called The Russian Woodpecker Hunting Club.

Signal disappearance
Starting in the late 1980s, even as the FCC was publishing studies, the signals became less frequent, and in 1989, they disappeared. Although the reasons for the eventual shutdown of the Duga systems have not been made public, the changing strategic balance with the end of the Cold War in the late 1980s maybe had a part to play. Another factor perhaps was the success of the US-KS early-warning satellites, which began entering service in the early 1980s, and by this time had grown into a complete network. The satellite system provides immediate, direct and highly secure warnings, whereas any radar-based system is subject to jamming, and the effectiveness of OTH systems is also subject to atmospheric conditions.

According to some reports, the Komsomolsk-on-Amur installation in the Russian Far East was taken off combat alert duty in November 1989, and some of its equipment was subsequently scrapped. The original Duga-1 site lies within the  Zone of Alienation around the Chernobyl power plant. As of today, the radar appears permanently deactivated and will not likely receive future maintenance because such arrangements were not implemented within Russian and Ukrainian talks; with regards to the Dnepr early warning radar systems at Mukachevo and Sevastopol. Most of the antenna still stands and is often used by radio amateurs who visit the area using their own portable radio equipment.

Locations 

The original Duga was the first experimental system. Duga is able to track launches from the Far East and from submarines in the Pacific Ocean, as the missiles fly towards Novaya Zemlya in the Arctic Ocean. This huge radar complex was restored in 2002 after a fire seriously damaged it. It appears that the original Duga transmit and receive sites near Mykolaiv, Ukraine were demolished in 2006. 

The original Duga was supplanted by a pair of installations: western, Duga-1, and eastern, Duga-2. Duga-1 was built in northern Ukraine, between Liubech and Chernobyl-2. The site is open for pre-arranged visits, for which a permit must be obtained in advance; it has been open since approximately 28 October 2013. Operators who provide tours of Chernobyl and the surrounding areas are able to obtain the relevant paperwork.

Appearances in 21st-century media 
The Ukrainian-developed computer game series S.T.A.L.K.E.R. has a plot focused on the Chernobyl Nuclear Power Plant and the nuclear accident there. The game features many actual locations in the area, including the Duga-1 array. The array itself appears in S.T.A.L.K.E.R.: Clear Sky in the fictional city of Limansk-13. While the 'Brain Scorcher' from S.T.A.L.K.E.R.: Shadow of Chernobyl was inspired by theories that Duga-1 was used for mind control, it does not take the form of the real array.

Markiyan Kamysh's novel about illegal trips to the Duga, A Stroll to the Zone, was praised by reviewers as the most interesting literature debut of 2015 in Ukraine. The novel has been translated into French (with the title La Zone), and was published by French publishing house Arthaud (Groupe Flammarion). It was also later translated into English with the title Stalking the Atomic City.

In Call of Duty: Black Ops, the map "Grid" is placed in Pripyat near the Duga-1 array.
A game later in the series, Cold War, uses the duga as  location for a possible final mission and as a map in the Zombies game-mode “Outbreak”, the map being appropriately named "Duga". Said map has rappel lines that can take the player(s) up to the top or middle of the Duga, despite the actual radar array lacking this.

The Duga antenna array is also featured on the revised map "Verdansk '84" in the game Call of Duty: Warzone.

The 'Russian woodpecker' appears in Justin Scott's novel The Shipkiller.

The Duga at Chernobyl was the focus of the 2015 documentary film, The Russian Woodpecker, by Chad Gracia. The film includes interviews with the commander of the duga, Vladimir Musiets, as well as the Vice-Commander, the Head of the Data Center, and others involved in building and operating the radar. The documentary, which won numerous awards, also includes drone video footage of the array and handheld video footage of the surroundings as well as a climb to the top by the cinematographer, Artem Ryzhykov. The film also proposes a conspiracy theory that the Chernobyl disaster was engineered to cover up failures in the radar's design.

The Duga radar is featured in the drone racing simulator Liftoff, as "The Russian Woodpecker".

The Duga radar is also featured in the films of the Divergent series, where it was used as the giant wall and fence surrounding the main city. In wide shots, its structure was used to create computer-generated imagery of the superstructure and several close-up scenes were shot directly at its location.

A Duga radar is featured in the 2017 game Player Unknown's Battlegrounds in a map which portrays a fictional Russian Military base.

The Chernobyl DLC for the game Spintires features a representation of the sarcophagus and an antenna array similar in appearance to Duga.

The Duga radar is heavily featured in the virtual reality game Proze: Enlightenment, a suspense/puzzle game with the theory that the radar is being used by mind controlling experiments during the 1950-60s. The game actually starts with the player ascending one of the pylons on a maintenance lift.

A Duga radar is featured in the 2019 video game Chernobylite.

In episode 12 of the first season of the NBC science fiction series Debris, the Duga radar array makes an appearance as a fictional array in the state of Virginia.

The Chernobyl Duga site is featured in Discovery Channel's series "Mysteries of the Abandoned" (season 1, episode 4). 

At the end of the first S.T.A.L.K.E.R. 2: Heart of Chornobyl gameplay trailer, a Duga radar made an appearance.

See also
 Cobra Mist
 Jindalee Operational Radar Network, a similar Australian system.
 Numbers station
 The Buzzer
 Container (29B6) radar, new Russian OTH Radar with similar radio interference to the Duga.

References

Further reading
 
 
 Headrick, James M., Ch. 24: "HF over-the-horizon radar," in: Radar Handbook, 2nd ed., Merrill I. Skolnik, ed. [New York:  McGraw-Hill, 1990].
 Kosolov, A. A., ed. Over-the-Horizon Radar (translated by W. F. Barton) [ Norton, Mass.:  Artech House, 1987].

External links

 Chernobyl-2. Secret Military Facility in the territory of exclusion zone. Text and photos  2008
 OTH-Radar "Chornobyl - 2" and Center of space-communication
 "Circle" is an auxiliary system for OTH-Radar "Chornobyl - 2"
 The Russian Woodpecker, Miami Herald, July 1982.
 Steel Yard OTH, globalsecurity.org
 Some pictures of Chernobyl-2
 'Duga' photos at englishrussia.com
 Chernobyl-2
 The Top Secret Military Base Hidden in Chernobyl’s Irradiated Forest
 Obsidian Urbex Photography | Photos taken in 2016

Cold War history of the Soviet Union
Amateur radio history
International broadcasting
Russian and Soviet military radars
1976 establishments in the Soviet Union
1989 disestablishments
Science and technology in the Soviet Union
Over-the-horizon radars
Military equipment introduced in the 1970s